Kohler is a village in Sheboygan County, Wisconsin, United States, along the Sheboygan River. The population was 2,120 at the 2010 census. It is included in the Sheboygan, Wisconsin Metropolitan Statistical Area.

History
Originally called Riverside within the rural Town of Sheboygan, the village was founded as a model company town in 1900 when the Kohler Company built a new plant at the location. The village was incorporated in 1912 as the Village of Kohler.  Of the original homes, most built between 1917 and 1931, approximately 95% are owner occupied. The Kohler Company continues to retain final authority over the design of home and business additions, outbuildings and fences in the village to keep them within a certain aesthetic standard.
 
In 1934, 1954–1965, 1983, and 2015, the United Auto Workers and other unions have gone on strike against the Kohler Company, causing limited to major disruptions to village operations.

Geography
Kohler is located at  (43.738244, -87.781109).

Demographics

2010 census

As of the census of 2010, there were 2,120 people, 784 households, and 608 families residing in the village. The racial makeup of the village was 96.0% White, 0.2% African American, 2.5% Asian, 0.2% from other races, and 1.1% from two or more races. Hispanic or Latino of any race were 2.3% of the population.

There were 784 households, of which 38.6% had children under the age of 18 living with them, 68.9% were married couples living together, 6.6% had a female householder with no husband present, 2.0% had a male householder with no wife present, and 22.4% were non-families. 19.0% of all households were made up of individuals, and 9.8% had someone living alone who was 65 years of age or older. The average household size was 2.70 and the average family size was 3.12.

The median age in the village was 42 years. 30.5% of residents were under the age of 18; 3.2% were between the ages of 18 and 24; 22% were from 25 to 44; 29.4% were from 45 to 64; and 15% were 65 years of age or older. The gender makeup of the village was 47.2% male and 52.8% female.

2000 census
Census 2000 data:

The population density was 354.0 people per square mile (136.7/km2). There were 792 housing units at an average density of 145.6 per square mile (56.2/km2).

There were 568 families and 737 households, out of which 38.7% had children under the age of 18 living with them, 71.4% were married couples living together, 3.9% had a female householder with no husband present, and 22.9% were non-families. 21.0% of all households were made up of individuals, and 10.3% had someone living alone who was 65 years of age or older. The average household size was 2.61 and the average family size was 3.06.

In the village, the population was spread out, with 28.8% under the age of 18, 3.3% from 18 to 24, 27.5% from 25 to 44, 27.9% from 45 to 64, and 12.5% who were 65 years of age or older. The median age was 40 years. For every 100 females, there were 92.2 males. For every 100 females age 18 and over, there were 93.0 males.

The median income for a household in the village was $75,000, and the median income for a family was $86,123. Males had a median income of $53,839 versus $32,188 for females. The per capita income for the village was $39,355. About 2.6% of families and 2.8% of the population were below the poverty line, including 3.4% of those under age 18 and 3.9% of those age 65 or over.

Businesses
As a company town, the Kohler Company, a leading plumbing and small engine company, is the village's largest employer. Kohler's hospitality division along with its residential real estate and retail arms make up the largest goods and services employer of the village. 

Kohler has two major shopping areas: the Shops at Woodlake Kohler just north of the village's downtown, and Deertrace on  the extreme southeast side of the village at the intersection of WI 28 and Washington Avenue.

In July 2022, Aurora Health Care opened Aurora Medical Center Sheboygan County, which replaced the 89-year-old Aurora Sheboygan Memorial Medical Center. It is located on Union Avenue east of I-43 on Kohler village land north of the Acuity Insurance campus. The land itself is otherwise inaccessible from Kohler proper itself without going through Sheboygan.

Gallery

Notable people 
 Jake Dickert, football coach
 Walter Ireland, member of Wisconsin State Assembly and businessman
 David Kohler, president and chief executive officer, Kohler Company
 Herbert Kohler, Jr.,  industrialist
 John Michael Kohler, founder of Kohler Company, industrialist, philanthropist
 Walter J. Kohler, Sr., politician and industrialist, 26th Governor of Wisconsin
 Walter J. Kohler, Jr., politician and industrialist, 33rd Governor of Wisconsin
 David Leitch, Hollywood stuntman and film director
 Joe Wolf, retired NBA player

See also
 List of villages in Wisconsin

References

External links

 
 

Villages in Sheboygan County, Wisconsin
Villages in Wisconsin
Company towns in Wisconsin
Kohler Company